The Bell Shrine of St. Cuileáin (or Glenkeen Bell Shrine or the Barnaan-Cuilawn)  is an early mediaeval Irish bell shrine found near Borrisoleigh in County Tipperary, Ireland. The bell is capped by arched openwork mounds, decorated with silver, gold and copper, and has two facing human heads at either side. The main panel would have been its most decorated but is lost, apart from various animal heads on both sides of its upper wings.  

The shrine was built for to enshrine an early Christian Iron hand-bell dated to c. 1100, used to mark canonical hours and to call for mass. The shrine is badly damaged, having lost all of its front plate and one of its sides. It is first mentioned in Irish records in 1825, and has been in the British Museum's collection since 1854.

Function

Objects associated with saints and church leaders were venerated by for their miraculous powers and were an important feature of religious life in early medieval Ireland. Irish monasticism generally avoided dissecting the actual remains of its leaders for relics, but valued objects with which they had had close personal contact.  In later periods these were often cased in an elaborate covering; cumdach is a term for books treated in this way.

Early monastic leaders called their small communities together for the events of their daily routine by ringing a handbell. Revered for their divine intervention, water drank from the reliquaries was said to cure illnesses and bring good fortune. Other important bell shrines include St Patrick's Bell and the 10th century Corp Naomh (both in the National Museum of Ireland), and St Conall Cael's Bell (in the British Museum).

Description

The bell was made from iron in the 7th or 8th centuries AD, while the shrine was formed in a number of phases. The shrine is badly damaged and is missing its front face and one of its side plates. The outer case was produced in the late 11th or early 12th century. The brass case is incomplete and would have originally been fronted by a jewelled crucifix. The two sides of the upper section each contain an inward looking human faces.

The red and yellow enamel and niello inlaid crest on the outer case forms decorations influenced by the Ringerike style, reflecting the influence of Viking art on contemporary Irish relics. The ribboned, zoomorphic animals on the sides resemble those on the early 10th century Shrine of Saint Lachtin's Arm, while the human heads recall those on the 12th century Lismore Crozier. Early records claim that the front of the shrine once contained a cross "enriched with...precious stones".

Providence
The bell-shrine is said to have been made for the Glenkeen Monastery, founded by Saint Cuileáin in the 7th century AD. Cuileáin came from a powerful dynasty in mediaeval Ireland as his brother Cormac was Bishop of Cashel nearby. The bell-shrine was revered for centuries by the local population and is said to have been discovered inside a tree at Kilcuilawn near Glankeen in the early nineteenth century. It was purchased by the Anglo Irish antiquary T. L. Cooke, who in turn sold it to the British Museum in 1854.

References

Sources

External links
 The Bells of the Irish Saints, 2021 video lecture by Cormac Bourke

Archaeology of Ireland
Bell-shrines
Medieval European objects in the British Museum